Glenn Cunningham (born 10 June 1975 in Bristol) is a former International speedway rider who rode for the various clubs in the British Premier League.

Speedway career
Glenn started his career with Oxford Cheetahs in 1991 and has since ridden for the Swindon Robins, Reading Racers, Peterborough Panthers, Newport Wasps, Belle Vue Aces, Eastbourne Eagles and Somerset Rebels.

In 1998 he reached the Overseas Final and finished on the podium in third place, as well as winning the Premier League Championship, the Premier League Riders Championship, the Premier League Fours and the Premier League Pairs with his club side, Peterborough Panthers. To cap his best ever season he was selected to ride for England against Australia at Eastbourne.

Honours
Premier League Riders Champion 1998, (Runner-up) 1997
Premier League Champions 1997 (Reading Racers), 1998 (Peterborough Panthers)
Premier League Fours Champion 1998 (Peterborough Panthers), 2005 (Somerset Rebels)
Premier League Champion 1998 with Brett Woodifield (Peterborough Panthers)

World Longtrack Championship

Grand-Prix Years

 1997 - Five apps - 76pts (3rd)
 1988 - Four apps - 53pts (7th)
 1999 - Five apps - 47pts (10th)
 2000 - Five apps - 36pts (11th)
 2001 - Four apps - 29pts (13th)
 2002 - Three apps - 7pts (20th)

Best Individual G.P. Results

First

  Aduard 1997

Third

  Scheeßel 1998
  Marmande 1998

References 

1975 births
Living people
British speedway riders
English motorcycle racers
Newport Wasps riders
Oxford Cheetahs riders
Peterborough Panthers riders
Reading Racers riders
Somerset Rebels riders
Stoke Potters riders
Swindon Robins riders
Individual Speedway Long Track World Championship riders